Agonidium nepalense is a species of ground beetle in the subfamily Platyninae. It was described by Habu in 1973.

References

nepalense
Beetles described in 1973